Viking Link is a 1,400 MW HVDC submarine power cable under construction between the United Kingdom and Denmark.

Current status
Land cables and submarine cables are being installed since 2020 and expected to finish in 2023. As of August 2022 Denmark's TSO Energinet expects Viking Link to be commissioned in December 2023.

Route
The cable will run between Bicker Fen in Lincolnshire, the United Kingdom and Revsing in southern Jutland, Denmark.

Specification
The interconnector will be capable of transmitting up to 1,400 MW at 525 kV i.e. an annual transmission capacity of 12.3 TWh.

It is similar in capacity and length to the UK–Norway North Sea Link.

Ownership
The project is a cooperation between British National Grid and Danish Energinet.

Project history
In November 2015 Viking Link was put on the EU "Projects of Common Interest" list, along with the COBRAcable between Jutland and the Netherlands, and the Krieger offshore wind turbine cable to Germany.

In January 2017 Viking Link announced a €1.3 billion tender for seven contracts that detail all aspects of constructing and later maintaining both the land and sea components of the link.

In March 2017 Fugro announced the completion of their contract to survey the seabed for the subsea section of the interconnector.

According to some experts including National Grid's head of strategy the UK's decision to leave the EU can negatively influence the effort to link the UK power grid with the continent and may put planned interconnectors such as Viking Link on hold. In reaction to the Brexit referendum Viking Link stated that the plans to build and operate the interconnector remain unchanged and that they consider the project unlikely to be influenced since it has a strong business case, while National Grid claims that leaving the internal energy market would jeopardize interconnector projects such as Viking Link.

In July 2019 Viking Link announced three contracts totaling €1.1 billion, one with Siemens for the two onshore substations and two for the manufacture and laying of the undersea cables to be done by Prysmian Powerlink S.r.l. and NKT HV Cables AB. Construction work is scheduled to start mid-2020 and expected to be complete by end 2023.

In December 2019, contracts were awarded for the UK onshore construction works.

In November 2019, it was announced that preparation work had started on the beach in Denmark.

In July 2020, Viking Link announced that work had started on the 475 mile interconnector.
Construction commenced with the building of an access road at Bicker Fen. 

In February 2021, Balfour Beatty started drilling work for the project.

Economic impact
It will increase the UK's electricity interconnection level (transmission capacity relative to production capacity) from its comparatively low rate of 6%.

The Viking Link will give the UK access to the west Denmark bidding area (DK1) of Nord Pool Spot. An analysis in 2016 showed a DKK 5.6 billion overall benefit for the society using Viking Link, and a DKK 20 billion benefit for heat pumps in district heating. Combining the two yields a benefit of DKK 22.8 billion. By 2022 prices in Denmark are projected to rise by 15 DKK/MWh, and fall in England. The investment is estimated at 13.4 billion DKK.

A new 400kV supporting power line in Denmark is expected to increase internal transmission capacity and reduce overhead power lines from 324 km to 145 km.

See also
 Electricity sector in Denmark
 Electricity sector in the United Kingdom
 Energy in Denmark
 Energy in the United Kingdom
 COBRAcable, a 700 MW cable between Denmark and the Netherlands
 Nemo Link, a 1000 MW cable between the United Kingdom and Belgium
 North Sea Link, a 1400 MW cable between the United Kingdom and Norway
 Triton Knoll, an 857 MW offshore wind farm under construction, also with an onshore cable linking to Bicker Fen

References

External links
 
 Project route in England
 Map with power line and substation

Electric power infrastructure in Denmark
Electric power infrastructure in England
Electrical interconnectors in the North Sea
Electrical interconnectors to and from Great Britain
Electrical interconnectors to and from the Synchronous Grid of Continental Europe
HVDC transmission lines
Proposed electric power transmission systems
Proposed electric power infrastructure in Europe